Lakeview Park is a football stadium in Loughgall, Northern Ireland. It is the home ground of Loughgall F.C.  The stadium holds 3,000. As the name suggests, Lakeview Park is adjacent to a lake.

External links
IFCP photos from Lakeview Park

Association football venues in Northern Ireland
Sports venues in County Armagh